Vaulx-en-Velin is a commune in the Metropolis of Lyon, Auvergne-Rhône-Alpes, eastern France. It is the third-largest suburb of the city of Lyon, and is located to its northeast, on the river Rhône.

History
The rivers, including the Rhône, regularly overflowed their banks, leaving behind a swampy area. The first verifiable mention of the village of Vaulx-en-Velin comes from the year 1225. The place was not spared from wars either. In 1628 the plague raged in the village.
Many people suffered from malaria - the field name "En Palud" testifies to this. A dike was built between 1863 and 1879 to dry out around 9,000 hectares of land. The Saint Jean Villeurbanne dam, built between 1879 and 1882, protects Vaulx-en-Velin from flooding.

In September 1979 the first Banlieue suburban youth riots in France broke out in the Cité Olivier-de-Serres in Vaulx-en-Velin.

One third of the population lives below the poverty line.

On 16 December 2022, a large fire broke out in a seven-storey apartment building, killing ten people, including five children, and injuring 14.

Population

Transport

 Metro line A
 Tram T3
 Several buses lines from Transports en commun lyonnais
 Rhônexpress

Personalities
 Mohamed Aggoun (born 2002), footballer
Nathalie Arthaud (born 1970), candidate for the 2012 presidential election, was one of the municipal councillors
Marie-Frédérique Ayissi (born 1982), basketball player
Junior Sambia (born 1996), footballer
Khal Torabully (born 1956), writer and director
 Corinne Vigreux (born 1964), business executive and co-founder of TomTom

See also
 Communes of the Metropolis of Lyon

References

External links

 Official website 

Communes of Lyon Metropolis
Dauphiné